William Bryan Saulpaugh (1905 – April 22, 1933) was an American racecar driver. Saulpaugh relieved Chet Miller in the 1931 Indianapolis 500 for 49 laps and qualified for the 1932 race in a Miller in the third position but was knocked out after 55 laps by a broken oil line and was credited with 32nd. He made two other National Championship starts that season and finished 19th in the championship. He was killed by a crash in a sprint car race in Oakland, California.

Biography
He was born 1905 in Taylor Ridge, Illinois, to Frederik U. Saulpaugh and Giralda M. Mosher. He died on April 22, 1933 in Oakland, California.

Award
Saulpaugh was inducted in the National Sprint Car Hall of Fame in 2004.

Indy 500 results

References

1905 births
1933 deaths
Indianapolis 500 drivers
National Sprint Car Hall of Fame inductees
People from Rock Island County, Illinois
Racing drivers from Illinois
Racing drivers who died while racing
Sports deaths in California